Verticalnet, Inc. was a host of 43 business-to-business (B2B) procurement portals headquartered in Horsham, Pennsylvania. It was famous for its market capitalization of $10.89 billion on March 10, 2000, during the dot-com bubble, despite sales of only $112.5 million in 2000. Verticalnet was acquired by Bravo Solutions in 2008 for $15.2 million.

History
Verticalnet was founded in 1995 by Michael McNulty and Michael Hagan with a site called WaterOnline.

In 1997, Mark Walsh joined the company as its chief executive officer.

In 1999, on the first day of trading after its initial public offering, its shares increased in value by 180%, valuing the company at $1.6 billion, despite only having $3.6 million in quarterly revenue. The company had 1,300 advertisers, each of which were paying $6,000 per year. At that time, Internet Capital Group, now Actua Corporation, owned 28% of the company and founders Michael McNulty and Michael Hagan were each worth $60 million on paper.

In 1999, the company lost $53.5 million on revenues of $18.4 million. In 2000, revenues increased to $112.5 million and the company posted a cash loss of $28.5 million.

In January 2000, the company received a $100 million investment from Microsoft.

During 2000, the dot-com bubble burst, and the market capitalization of the company fell from a peak of $10.89 billion on March 10, 2000 to $3.89 billion on May 4, 2000.

In 2002, Verticalnet acquired Atlas Commerce for 14.3 million shares of Verticalnet common stock and $3.5 million of cash and the company relocated to Malvern, Pennsylvania.

In 2002, VerticalNet sold its Small and Medium Business Group to Corry Publishing, now Jameson Publishing, for a cash up-front payment of $2.35 million and a four-year performance-based earn-out of $6.5 million, as well as the assumption of certain liabilities.

In 2008, Bravo Solutions acquired Verticalnet for $15.2 million.

References

1995 establishments in Pennsylvania
1999 initial public offerings
2008 disestablishments in Pennsylvania
American companies established in 1995
Companies formerly listed on the Nasdaq
Companies disestablished in 2008
Dot-com bubble